Credit Corp Group Limited  is an Australian debt buyer. The company purchases and collects debts in Australia, New Zealand and the United States (US).

The business purchases consumer and small business debt from Australian, New Zealand and US banks, finance companies, telecommunication and utility companies. Through its subsidiary Credit Corp Financial Services Pty Limited, Credit Corp offers online consumer finance.

Credit Corp Group Limited has been listed on the Australian Securities Exchange since 2000.

References

External links
Credit Corp Group Website
Debt Collectors Comparison

Debt collection
Companies listed on the Australian Securities Exchange